Bryan K. Reeves (born July 10, 1970) is a former American football wide receiver in the National Football League (NFL) and Arena Football League (AFL). He played in the NFL for the Arizona Cardinals and the AFL for the Anaheim Piranhas, Milwaukee Mustangs and New York CityHawks. He played college football at El Camino College, Arizona State and Nevada.

See also 
 List of NCAA major college football yearly receiving leaders

References

1970 births
Living people
People from Carson, California
Players of American football from California
Sportspeople from Los Angeles County, California
American football wide receivers
Nevada Wolf Pack football players
El Camino Warriors football players
Arizona State Sun Devils football players
Arizona Cardinals players
Anaheim Piranhas players
Milwaukee Mustangs (1994–2001) players
New York CityHawks players